Elections for the Constituent Assembly were held in Lithuania between 14 and 16 April 1920. The Lithuanian Christian Democratic Party emerged as the largest party, winning 24 of the 112 seats.

Results

References

Lithuania
Parliament
Parliamentary elections in Lithuania
Lithuania